The 1985 Portuguese legislative election took place on 6 October. The election renewed all 250 members of the Assembly of the Republic.

In June of the same year, the then incumbent Prime Minister, Mário Soares, resigned from the job due to the lack of parliamentary support, the government was composed by a coalition of the two major parties, the center-right Social Democratic and the center-left Socialist, in what was called the Central Bloc, however this was an unstable balance of forces and several members of each party opposed such alliance.

The new leader of the Social Democratic Party, Cavaco Silva, elected in May, was among those that never supported such alliance, and short after being elected leader of the party made the coalition fall in July. Mário Soares didn't run again and resigned as party leader, as he decided to run for the 1986 Presidential elections. The PS nominated Almeida Santos, minister of state in Soares government, as intern leader and as the party candidate for Prime Minister.

A new election was called by the President and the Social Democrats won with a short majority and Cavaco became the Prime-Minister. The election was the first of three consecutive election victories for the Social Democratic Party. Meanwhile, a new party had been founded by supporters of the President Ramalho Eanes, the Democratic Renewal Party, led by Hermínio Martinho that surprisingly gained 45 MPs and more than one million votes in the election and became the parliamentary support of the Cavaco's government until 1987, when it removed its support, making Cavaco fall.

The Communists and the Socialists lost votes and MPs, and the left would only return to the government ten years later, in 1995.

Background

Leadership changes

PSD 1985 leadership election
By 1985, deep divisions were consuming the PSD regarding their role in the Central Bloc government with the PS. Then deputy Prime Minister and PSD leader Carlos Mota Pinto, resigned from the government and the party's leadership and a snap party congress was called. But, Mota Pinto, who was expected to run for the leadership in the snap congress, died suddenly just 10 days before the start of the congress in Figueira da Foz. João Salgueiro, the candidate from "Mota Pinto's wing" was expected to win easily, but former finance minister Aníbal Cavaco Silva surprised the party by announcing a late candidacy, in what is now known as the "Running-in of Cavaco's new Citroën". Cavaco Silva had the support of the wings against the Central Bloc, and against all odds he defeated Salgueiro by just 57 votes. The results were the following:

|- style="background-color:#E9E9E9"
! align="center" colspan=2 style="width:  60px"|Candidate
! align="center" style="width:  50px"|Votes
! align="center" style="width:  50px"|%
|-
|bgcolor=|
| align=left | Aníbal Cavaco Silva
| align=right | 422
| align=right | 53.6
|-
|bgcolor=|
| align=left | João Salgueiro
| align=right | 365
| align=right | 46.4
|-
|- style="background-color:#E9E9E9"
| colspan=2 style="text-align:left;" |   Turnout
| align=right | 787
| align=center | 
|-
| colspan="4" align=left|Source: Results
|}

PS 1985 nomination selection
After the fall of the Central Bloc government, Mário Soares was acclaimed as the PS candidate for the 1986 Presidential election, and shortly after, António Almeida Santos was unanimously selected as the party's candidate for Prime Minister in the 1985 general elections.

|- style="background-color:#E9E9E9"
! align="center" colspan=2 style="width:  60px"|Candidate
! align="center" style="width:  50px"|Votes
! align="center" style="width:  50px"|%
|-
|bgcolor=|
| align=left | António Almeida Santos
| colspan="2" align=right | Voice vote
|-
|- style="background-color:#E9E9E9"
| colspan=2 style="text-align:left;" |   Turnout
| align=right | 
| align=right | 100.0
|-
| colspan="4" align=left|Source:
|}

Electoral system 
The Assembly of the Republic has 250 members elected to four-year terms. Governments do not require absolute majority support of the Assembly to hold office, as even if the number of opposers of government is larger than that of the supporters, the number of opposers still needs to be equal or greater than 126 (absolute majority) for both the Government's Programme to be rejected or for a motion of no confidence to be approved.

The number of seats assigned to each district depends on the district magnitude. The use of the d'Hondt method makes for a higher effective threshold than certain other allocation methods such as the Hare quota or Sainte-Laguë method, which are more generous to small parties.

For these elections, and compared with the 1983 elections, the MPs distributed by districts were the following:

Parties
The table below lists the parties represented in the Assembly of the Republic during the 3rd legislature (1983–1985) and that also partook in the election:

Campaign period

Party slogans

Candidates' debates

Opinion polling

The following table shows the opinion polls of voting intention of the Portuguese voters before the election. Those parties that are listed were represented in parliament (1983-1985). Included is also the result of the Portuguese general elections in 1983 and 1985 for reference.

National summary of votes and seats

|-
| colspan=11| 
|- 
! rowspan="2" colspan=2 style="background-color:#E9E9E9;text-align:left;" |Parties
! rowspan="2" style="background-color:#E9E9E9;text-align:right;" |Votes
! rowspan="2" style="background-color:#E9E9E9;text-align:right;" |%
! rowspan="2" style="background-color:#E9E9E9;text-align:right;" |±
! colspan="5" style="background-color:#E9E9E9;text-align:center;" |MPs
! rowspan="2" style="background-color:#E9E9E9;text-align:right;" |MPs %/votes %
|- style="background-color:#E9E9E9"
! style="background-color:#E9E9E9;text-align:center;"|1983
! style="background-color:#E9E9E9;text-align:center;"|1985
! style="background-color:#E9E9E9;text-align:right;" |±
! style="background-color:#E9E9E9;text-align:right;" |%
! style="background-color:#E9E9E9;text-align:right;" |±
|-
| 
|1,732,288||29.87||2.7||75||88||13||35.20||5.2||1.18
|-
| 
|1,204,321||20.77||15.3||101||57||44||22.80||17.6||1.10
|-
| 
|1,038,893||17.92||||||45||||18.00||||1.00
|-
| 
|898,281||15.49||2.6||44||38||6||15.20||2.4||0.98
|-
| 
|577,580||9.96||2.6||30||22||8||8.80||3.2||0.88
|-
| style="width:10px;background-color:#E2062C;text-align:center;" | 
| style="text-align:left;" |People's Democratic Union
|73,401||1.27||0.8||0||0||0||0.00||0.0||0.0
|-
| 
|41,831||0.72||0.0||0||0||0||0.00||0.0||0.0
|-
| 
|35,238||0.61||0.4||0||0||0||0.00||0.0||0.0
|-
| 
|19,943||0.34||0.1||0||0||0||0.00||0.0||0.0
|-
| 
|19,085||0.33||0.0||0||0||0||0.00||0.0||0.0
|-
| 
|12,749||0.22||0.2||0||0||0||0.00||0.0||0.0
|-
|colspan=2 style="text-align:left;background-color:#E9E9E9"|Total valid 
|width="65" style="text-align:right;background-color:#E9E9E9"|5,653,610
|width="40" style="text-align:right;background-color:#E9E9E9"|97.49
|width="40" style="text-align:right;background-color:#E9E9E9"|0.1
|width="40" style="text-align:right;background-color:#E9E9E9"|250
|width="40" style="text-align:right;background-color:#E9E9E9"|250
|width="40" style="text-align:right;background-color:#E9E9E9"|0
|width="40" style="text-align:right;background-color:#E9E9E9"|100.00
|width="40" style="text-align:right;background-color:#E9E9E9"|0.0
|width="40" style="text-align:right;background-color:#E9E9E9"|—
|-
|colspan=2|Blank ballots
|48,709||0.84||0.1||colspan=6 rowspan=4|
|-
|colspan=2|Invalid ballots
|96,610||1.67||0.1
|-
|colspan=2 style="text-align:left;background-color:#E9E9E9"|Total 
|width="65" style="text-align:right;background-color:#E9E9E9"|5,798,929
|width="40" style="text-align:right;background-color:#E9E9E9"|100.00
|width="40" style="text-align:right;background-color:#E9E9E9"|
|-
|colspan=2|Registered voters/turnout
||7,818,981||74.16||3.6
|-
| colspan=11 style="text-align:left;" | Source: Comissão Nacional de Eleições

Distribution by constituency

|- class="unsortable"
!rowspan=2|Constituency!!%!!S!!%!!S!!%!!S!!%!!S!!%!!S
!rowspan=2|TotalS
|- class="unsortable" style="text-align:center;"
!colspan=2 | PSD
!colspan=2 | PS
!colspan=2 | PRD
!colspan=2 | APU
!colspan=2 | CDS
|-
| style="text-align:left;" | Azores
| style="background:; color:white;"|48.3
| 3
| 20.1
| 1
| 15.2
| 1
| 4.4
| -
| 6.5
| -
| 5
|-
| style="text-align:left;" | Aveiro
| style="background:; color:white;"|38.4
| 6
| 23.0
| 4
| 13.4
| 2
| 6.5
| 1
| 13.5
| 2
| 15
|-
| style="text-align:left;" | Beja
| 13.7
| 1
| 20.1
| 1
| 11.6
| -
| style="background:red; color:white;"|44.9
| 3
| 2.2
| -
| 5
|-
| style="text-align:left;" | Braga
| style="background:; color:white;"|32.8
| 6
| 21.8
| 4
| 16.8
| 3
| 8.5
| 1
| 14.0
| 2
| 16
|-
| style="text-align:left;" | Bragança
| style="background:; color:white;"|39.2
| 2
| 22.7
| 1
| 6.9
| -
| 5.3
| -
| 17.1
| 1
| 4
|-
| style="text-align:left;" | Castelo Branco
| style="background:; color:white;"|31.2
| 3
| 18.5
| 1
| 24.4
| 2
| 8.9
| -
| 9.6
| -
| 6
|-
| style="text-align:left;" | Coimbra
| style="background:; color:white;"|29.5
| 4
| 28.5
| 3
| 16.9
| 2
| 10.1
| 1
| 8.6
| 1
| 11
|-
| style="text-align:left;" | Évora
| 19.1
| 1
| 14.3
| 1
| 15.8
| 1
| style="background:red; color:white;"|41.2
| 2
| 3.3
| -
| 5
|-
| style="text-align:left;" | Faro
| style="background:; color:white;"|28.4
| 3
| 22.3
| 2
| 20.5
| 2
| 15.4
| 2
| 6.1
| -
| 9
|-
| style="text-align:left;" | Guarda
| style="background:; color:white;"|33.6
| 2
| 23.3
| 2
| 10.9
| -
| 5.2
| -
| 19.5
| 1
| 5
|-
| style="text-align:left;" | Leiria
| style="background:; color:white;"|38.6
| 5
| 19.6
| 2
| 15.3
| 2
| 7.9
| 1
| 12.2
| 1
| 11
|-
| style="text-align:left;" | Lisbon
| style="background:; color:white;"|25.6
| 15
| 19.8
| 12
| 21.3
| 13
| 20.1
| 12
| 8.1
| 4
| 56
|-
| style="text-align:left;" | Madeira
| style="background:; color:white;"|56.8
| 4
| 13.2
| 1
| 9.7
| -
| 3.2
| -
| 7.8
| -
| 5
|-
| style="text-align:left;" | Portalegre
| 20.9
| 1
| 23.7
| 1
| 18.9
| -
| style="background:red; color:white;"|25.2
| 1
| 4.9
| -
| 3
|-
| style="text-align:left;" | Porto
| style="background:; color:white;"|29.3
| 12
| 23.6
| 10
| 20.5
| 8
| 12.1
| 5
| 9.8
| 4
| 39
|-
| style="text-align:left;" | Santarém
| style="background:; color:white;"|27.8
| 4
| 18.6
| 2
| 23.8
| 3
| 16.4
| 2
| 7.7
| 1
| 12
|-
| style="text-align:left;" | Setúbal
| 15.4
| 3
| 16.5
| 3
| 20.4
| 4
| style="background:red; color:white;"|38.2
| 7
| 3.8
| -
| 17
|-
| style="text-align:left;" | Viana do Castelo
| style="background:; color:white;"|33.5
| 3
| 18.4
| 1
| 16.2
| 1
| 8.2
| -
| 16.6
| 1
| 6
|-
| style="text-align:left;" | Vila Real
| style="background:; color:white;"|42.2
| 3
| 23.0
| 2
| 8.6
| -
| 5.9
| -
| 12.5
| 1
| 6
|-
| style="text-align:left;" | Viseu
| style="background:; color:white;"|37.7
| 5
| 20.0
| 2
| 10.9
| 1
| 5.0
| -
| 19.9
| 2
| 10
|-
| style="text-align:left;" | Europe
| style="background:; color:white;"|24.3
| 1
| 24.2
| 1
| 7.1
| -
| 18.8
| -
| 17.3
| -
| 2
|-
| style="text-align:left;" | Outside Europe 
| style="background:; color:white;"|40.5
| 1
| 7.8
| -
| 3.3
| -
| 2.6
| -
| 37.9
| 1
| 2
|-
|- class="unsortable" style="background:#E9E9E9"
| style="text-align:left;" | Total
| style="background:; color:white;"|29.9
| 88
| 20.8
| 57
| 17.9
| 45
| 15.5
| 38
| 10.0
| 22
| 250
|-
| colspan=12 style="text-align:left;" | Source: Comissão Nacional de Eleições
|}

Maps

Aftermath

Fall of the government
In early 1987, a trip of a Portuguese parliamentary delegation to the Soviet Union created a diplomatic issue as the delegation also traveled to Estonia, a territory that wasn't recognized by the Portuguese State as a Soviet controlled territory. Because of this incident, Opposition parties accused Cavaco Silva of disallowing Parliament and, shortly after, the Democratic Renewal Party proposed a motion of no confidence against the Government, and the party's leader, Hermínio Martinho, communicated to President Mário Soares their intentions. At first, the Socialists weren't supportive of the PRD's motion, but, last minute negociations led the PS to also support the motion. On 3 April 1987, the motion passes by a 134 to 108 vote and the government falls. Mário Soares was in an official trip to Brazil when he was informed, which unpleased the President, and he then returned to Lisbon to meet with parties. The PS, PRD and PCP proposed an alternative government to the PSD minority, but Soares rejected and called a snap general election for 19 July 1987, which resulted in a landslide PSD majority government.

See also
Politics of Portugal
List of political parties in Portugal
Elections in Portugal

Notes

References

Sources

External links 
Comissão Nacional de Eleições 
Centro de Estudos do Pensamento Político

1985
Legislative
October 1985 events in Europe